Freedom at Point Zero is the fifth album by Jefferson Starship and was released in 1979. It was the first album for new lead singer Mickey Thomas, and the first after both Grace Slick and Marty Balin left the previous year (Slick rejoined the band for their next album Modern Times in 1981 and Balin joined the revived Jefferson Starship in 1993). Aynsley Dunbar plays drums on this album; he had left Journey the previous year.

The single "Jane" peaked on the Billboard Hot 100 at No. 14 and spent three weeks at No. 6 on the Cash Box Top 100. "Jane" was featured in the 2009 video game Grand Theft Auto IV: The Lost and Damned, as well as the opening music to the film Wet Hot American Summer and its prequel series Wet Hot American Summer: First Day of Camp. It is one of the few songs that was performed live by both the Paul Kantner-led Jefferson Starship TNG and the Mickey Thomas-led Starship. The song "Lightning Rose" predicts the concept of the Nuclear Furniture album, and in fact its character Lightning Rose would return on Nuclear Furniture as the key character in that album's concept.

Record World called the single "Girl with the Hungry Eyes" a "ferocious rocker."  It said of "Rock Music" that "Mickey Thomas' frenetic vocals rip over roaring guitars."

Track listing

Charts

Personnel
Mickey Thomas – lead (1, 3-9) and backing vocals
Paul Kantner – lead (2, 9) and backing vocals, rhythm guitar, keyboards (3)
Craig Chaquico – lead guitar, rhythm guitar
David Freiberg – bass (1, 2, 4, 6, 8) synthesizer (3, 5, 7, 9), backing vocals
Pete Sears – bass (3, 4 (intro), 5, 7, 9), piano (1, 2, 4), electric piano (6), organ (8), rhythm guitar (8), backing vocals
Aynsley Dunbar – drums, percussion

Additional personnel
Steven Schuster – saxophone (1-3, 6, 9) 
Tower of Power – horns (1)

Production
Ron Nevison – producer for Gadget Productions, Inc., engineer
Michael Clink – engineer
Mike Reese – mastering
Pat Ieraci (Maurice) – production coordinator
Paul Dowell – amp consultant
Ria Lewerke-Shapiro – art direction, design
Gary Regester – photography
Tyrone Q. Thompson – star scout
Bill Thompson – manager
Recorded and mixed at The Record Plant, Los Angeles - Sausalito
Mastered at The Mastering Lab, Hollywood

Singles

References

Jefferson Starship albums
1979 albums
Albums produced by Ron Nevison
Grunt Records albums
Albums recorded at Record Plant (Los Angeles)